Six Pack is the third EP by the American hardcore punk band Black Flag. It was released in June 1981 through SST Records on 7" vinyl, and later on 10" and 12" vinyl in 1990.

Track listing

Personnel
Adapted from the album liner notes.

Black Flag
 Dez Cadena – vocals
 Greg Ginn – lead guitar
 Chuck Dukowski – bass guitar
 Robo – drums

Production
 Geza X – producer, recording engineer, mix engineer
 Spot – producer
 Raymond Pettibon – artwork

Charts

References

1981 EPs
Black Flag (band) EPs
Albums produced by Geza X
SST Records EPs